Njegoš Kupusović (born 22 February 2001) is a Serbian professional footballer who plays as a forward.

Career
In June 2019, Kupusović joined German club Erzgebirge Aue from Red Star Belgrade on a season-long loan. He made his professional debut for Aue in the 2. Bundesliga on 31 May 2020, coming on as a substitute in the 85th minute for Florian Krüger in the away match against 1. FC Heidenheim, which finished as a 0–3 loss.

In August 2020, Kupusović moved to Eintracht Braunschweig on a two-year contract.

On 18 June 2021, Türkgücü München confirmed Kupusović's signature to play in the 3. Liga.

References

External links
 
 
 
 
 

2001 births
Living people
Serbian footballers
Serbia youth international footballers
Association football forwards
Red Star Belgrade footballers
FC Erzgebirge Aue players
Eintracht Braunschweig players
Türkgücü München players
AS Trenčín players
2. Bundesliga players
Slovak Super Liga players
2. Liga (Slovakia) players
Serbian expatriate footballers
Serbian expatriate sportspeople in Germany
Expatriate footballers in Germany
Serbian expatriate sportspeople in Slovakia
Expatriate footballers in Slovakia